The European Financial Services Round Table (EFR) brings together chairmen and chief executives of leading European banks and insurance companies. The purpose of the EFR is to contribute to the European public policy debate on issues relating to financial services and to the financial stability with the completion of the single market in financial services. Paul Achleitner is Chairman of the EFR.

The EFR is also engaged in the lessons to be drawn from the financial crisis to render the financial system more resilient. The EFR deals in particular with the global G20 agenda, regulation and supervision, consumer protection and pensions. Current priorities are the Growth & Investment Agenda, the Digital Agenda & Cyber Security, Sustainable finance & Climate Change, Prudential Regulation The EFR has published, inter alia, positions, reports and press releases on those priority issues as well as on a wide range of topics such as European retail market, G20 agenda, the integration of pensions in Europe, harmonisation of regulation and supervision and consumer protection.

Member companies
The EFR has 23 members, the Chairmen of CEO's of:

 Aegon
 Allianz
 Aviva 
 AXA
 Barclays 
 BBVA 
 BNP Paribas 
 Crédit Agricole 
 Credit Suisse 
 Deutsche Bank 
 Assicurazioni Generali 
 HSBC 
 ING 
 Mapfre 
 Nordea 
 Prudential plc 
 Royal Bank of Scotland
 Santander
 Societé Générale
 Swiss Re
 UBS  
 UniCredit
 Zurich Insurance

See also

 Association for Financial Markets in Europe
 Financial market
 Financial services
 Inter-Alpha Group of Banks

Sources
 European Financial Services Round Table

Cross-European advocacy groups
Financial services organizations
Trade associations based in Belgium
Economy of Europe